The Bijela is a river in central Croatia, a right  tributary of the Pakra River. It is one of the biggest rivers in western Slavonia, flowing from east to west and enabling formation of fertile fields on its way.

History
In the Middle Ages the area of Bijela was owned mostly by the Tibold noble family, while in the mid-16th century  it was conquered by the Ottoman Empire. After the liberation in 1699, it became part of the Kingdom of Slavonia within the Habsburg monarchy.

Geography and hydrography

It has its source in Ravna Gora mountain near the village of Novo Zvečevo in the vicinity the Papuk Geopark area in the region of western Slavonia. The upper course of the river flows westwards, then turns near the village of Kapetanovo Polje to the southwest finally mouthing into the Pakra near the village of Poljana.

Throughout its course, Bijela receives the waters of many tributaries, like Željnjak, Brekinska, Miletina rijeka, Koritska rijeka, Orlovac and others. For smaller vessels it is navigable for much of its lowland flow.

Bijela is an important source of public water supplies, as well as for recreational use. It is known for its recreational fishing, i. e. sport fishing. The most represented fishes in it are brown trout, common carp and grass carp. There are also several nearby fish ponds (like Pjeskara, Raminac or Uljanik) in the Bijela-Pakra area, available for sport fishing, but also for very significant commercial fishing (Ribnjak Poljana).

See also

List of rivers of Croatia
Ilova (Sava)
Sirač

References

External links 
 Željnjak Brook empties into the Bijela River at Sirač village
 Fishing in rivers Bijela, Pakra and Toplica 
 Fishpond Poljana 

Rivers of Croatia
Landforms of Požega-Slavonia County